Dunsyre railway station served the village of Dunsyre, South Lanarkshire, Scotland from 1867 to 1945 on the Dolphinton branch.

History 
The station opened on 1 March 1867 by the Caledonian Railway. To the north was the goods yard. The station closed on 12 September 1932 but reopened on 17 July 1933 before closing permanently on 4 June 1945.

References

External links 

Disused railway stations in South Lanarkshire
Railway stations in Great Britain opened in 1867
Railway stations in Great Britain closed in 1932
Railway stations in Great Britain opened in 1933
Railway stations in Great Britain closed in 1945
Former Caledonian Railway stations
1867 establishments in Scotland
1945 disestablishments in Scotland